The Wyming Brook is a river in the City of Sheffield, England.  Its source is the Redmires Reservoirs near the Hallam Moors. It flows in a north-easterly direction for over  down quite steep terrain into an underground chamber where it joins the Rivelin tunnel before it flows into the lower of the Rivelin Dams. There is a walking path that runs alongside the brook. The path can be quite steep, with it and the brook falling over 100 m in a kilometre. The river flows almost its entire length within the Wyming Brook Nature Reserve, which is managed by the Wildlife Trust for Sheffield and Rotherham. The surrounds are wooded near the bottom and more open near the top, with views of the Rivelin Valley. Wildlife found around Wyming Brook includes the dipper and the crossbill. The Peak District Boundary Walk runs through the nature reserve.

Historically the area was used exclusively by the nobility when it was part of the hunting and hawking grounds of Rivelin Chase. Above, and to the west of the watercourse on Ash Cabin Flat is an embanked stone circle, dating to the Bronze Age.

References

 

Wyming Brook